Daria Ivanovna Shchukina (born 1 September 1979 in Chelyabinsk, Russia) is a Russian wheelchair curler, 2020 World champion.

Career
She is a member of the local sports club "Yunost-Metar" (Chelyabinsk).

She was a participant of the 2018 Winter Paralympic games and three World Wheelchair Curling Championships of 2017, 2019, 2020.

Teams

References

External links 

Profile at the International Paralympic Committee's website

Living people
1979 births
Sportspeople from Chelyabinsk
Russian female curlers
Russian wheelchair curlers
Wheelchair curlers at the 2018 Winter Paralympics
Paralympic wheelchair curlers of Russia
World wheelchair curling champions